Meysamabad may refer to:
 Meysamabad, Kerman
 Meysamabad, Markazi